Rusor may refer to:

 Rusina, a Roman deity
 Ruşor (disambiguation), in Romania